Amaknak Island or Umaknak Island is the most populated island in the Aleutian Islands, an archipelago which is part of the U.S. state of Alaska.

Geography
Amaknak is an islet of the Fox Islands archipelago, a portion of the Aleutian Islands, in the Aleutians West Census Area of southwestern Alaska. Amaknak Island is located within Unalaska Bay, an inlet of the Bering Sea on the northeast side of Unalaska Island. There is a 500-foot (152-meter) bridge joining the islands at another close point, where Iliuliuk Harbor connects with Captains Bay.

Population
Despite its small size, Amaknak is the most populous of all the islands of the Aleutians chain, with 2,524 residents as of the 2000 census. Though located within the boundaries of the City of Unalaska, the inhabitants of Amaknak generally regard themselves as residents of Dutch Harbor, which is the portion of the City of Unalaska located on Amaknak Island.  (The remaining 41% of Unalaska's residents live on Unalaska Island.)

See also
Battle of Dutch Harbor
Dutch Harbor Naval Operating Base and Fort Mears, U.S. Army

References

Further reading
"The Battle Over Amaknak Bridge — Progress Versus Preservation in Alaska's Aleutian Islands", article in Archaeology : a Magazine Dealing with the Antiquity of the World no. 3: 28. 60, 2007, by Heather Pringle.

 
Fox Islands (Alaska)
Islands of Aleutians West Census Area, Alaska
Islands of the Aleutian Islands
Islands of Alaska
Islands of Unorganized Borough, Alaska